Season two of the television program American Experience originally aired on the PBS network in the United States on October 3, 1989 and concluded on January 16, 1990. This is the second season to feature David McCullough as the host. The season contained 15 new episodes and began with the film The Great Air Race of 1924.

Episodes

References

1989 American television seasons
1990 American television seasons
American Experience